Hamburg State Park is a 741 acre (3.00 km²) state park located near Jewell and Warthen in the U.S. state of Georgia.  It is home to a 1921 water-powered grist mill still operating today, and a museum with antique agricultural tools and appliances used in rural Georgia.  The park's location on the 225 acre (0.91 km²) Hamburg Lake makes it a great place for fishing.

The state park took its name from the former industrial town of Hamburg, South Carolina.

Facilities
30 Tent/Trailer/RV Campsites
1 Group Shelter
1 Picnic Shelter 
Nature Trail

Images

References

External links
 
Georgia State Parks

State parks of Georgia (U.S. state)
Mill museums in Georgia (U.S. state)
Protected areas of Washington County, Georgia
Museums in Washington County, Georgia